This is a list of  Spanish words of French origin.  It is further divided into words that come from Modern French and Old French.  In both cases, the words included did not exist in Latin.  Some of these words have alternate etymologies and may also appear on a list of Spanish words from a different language.

List
abigarrado
alisios
begonia
bigote
blusa
brocha
bufanda
bufete
bufon
 bulevar, from boulevard
buzón
camión
&cancán
cerrojo
 chalet
&chaqueta
 cobarde
corchete
&daga
&danza
 debate
&destrozar
 estaca
 etiqueta, from étiquette
 extradición
 fraile
fruncir
gabinete
gafas
galleta
 garaje
 garantía
guante (glove)
hola
 homenaje
 hotel
izar
jerga
lona
 manjar
marrón
 mensaje
 panfleto
 pantalón
ráfaga
rampa
&rifa
&rifle
silueta
 sofá
 vinagre
 voyeur
rojob

Middle Ages 

 arnés (harneis)
 bachiller (bachelier)
 borde (bord)
 botín (butín)
 brida (bride)
 cable
 chimenea (cheminée)
 corcel (corsier)
 dama (dame)
 danzar (dancier)
 desmayar (esmaiier)
 flecha (fléche)
 forjar (forgier)
 franja (franje)
 galope (galop)
 galán (galant)
 jamón (jambon)
 jardín (jardín)
 joya (joye)
 ligero (légier)
 lonja (longe
 maleta (malette)
 mecha (méche)
 paje (page)
 tira de cuero)
 trotar (trotter)

16th century - 17th century 

 asamblea (assemblée)
 babor (babord)
 bagaje (bagage)
 banquete (banquet)
 baúl (bahur)
 billete (billet)
 blasón
 broche
 calibre
 carmín
 carpeta (carpette)
 conserje (concierge)
 convoy (convoy)
 crema (créme)
 esquela
 estribor (estribord)
 fresa (fraise)
 izar (hisser)
 marchar (marchar)
 marmita (marmite)
 moda (mode)
 paquete (paquet)
 parque (parc)
 servilleta (serviette)
 taburete (tabouret)

16th century 
  
 abonar (abonner)
 basalto (basalto)
 batista (batiste)
 billar (billard)
 bisturí (bistouri)
 boga (vogue)
 botella (bouteille)
 bucle (boucle)
 cacerola (casserole)
 cadete (cadet)
 canapé
 catastro (catastro
 compota (compote)
 corsé (corset)
 desertar (déserter)
 edredón (édredon)
 frambuesa (framboise)
 fusil
 grosella (groseille)
 jefe (chef)
 lingote (lingot)
 marmota (marmotte)
 muselina (mousseline)
 pantalón
 pingüino (pingouin)
 silueta (silhouette)
 tul (tulle)

19th century - 20th century 

 acordeón
 aterrizaje (aterrissage)
 avión
 babucha (babouche)
 biberón
 bicicleta (bicyclette)
 bloque (bloc)
 blusa (blouse)
 bol (same)
 bombón (bonbon)
 brasier (brassieres)
 bretel (bretelee)
 brochado (de broché)
 bujía (bougie)
 bulevar (boulevard)
 burocracia (bureaucratie)
 cabina (cabine)
 cabotaje (cabotage)
 camión
 carnet
 chalet
 chance
 chaqueta (jaquette)
 chasis (chassis)
 chimpancé (chimpanzé)
 comité
 consomé (consommé)
 coñac (cognac)
 cremallera (cremaillére)
 croquis
 debutar (débuter)
 doblaje (doublage)
 engranar (engrener)
 entrenar (entrainer)
 escalope
 esquí (ski)
 faya (faille)
 ficha (fiche)
 filmar (filmer)
 flan
 frac
 franela (flanelle)
 garaje (garage)
 gripe (grippe)
 higiene (hygiéne)
 hotel
 kilometraje (kilométrage)
 levita (lévito)
 lote (lot)
 maquillaje (maquillage)
 marrón
 nicotina (nicotine)
 complot
 paletó (paletot)
 pana (panne)
 patriota (patriote)
 pelotón
 percal (percale)
 pilotaje (pilotage)
 plisado (de plissé)
 quiosco (kiosque)
 resorte (ressort)
 rodaje (rodage)
 ruleta (roulette)
 rutina (routine)
 tafetán (taffetas)
 toilette

See also
Linguistic history of Spanish
List of English words of Spanish origin
List of German words of French origin

References
"Breve diccionario etimológico de la lengua española" by Guido Gómez de Silva

French